Courtnay Pilypaitis (born 11 February 1988) is a Canadian women's basketball coach and former professional basketball player. She played for Canada women's national basketball team. She competed in the 2012 Summer Olympics. In July 2016, she was named as an assistant coach with the UMBC Retrievers women's basketball team.

Pilypaitis attended the University of Vermont, where she graduated in 2010. She  returned to her alma mater as an assistant coach during the 2012/13 season. Pilypaitis retired as a player in April 2015.

Vermont statistics

Source

FIBA
She was invited to join the national team, to play in the 2013 FIBA Americas Championship for Women, held in Xalapa, Mexico from 21 to 28 September 2013. She averaged 3.2 points per game, and helped the Canadian National team to a second place, silver medal finish. Canada faced Cuba in a preliminary round and won 53–40, but in the championship game, Cuba prevailed 79–71.

References

1988 births
Living people
Basketball players at the 2012 Summer Olympics
Canadian expatriate basketball people in the United States
Canadian women's basketball players
Olympic basketball players of Canada
UMBC Retrievers women's basketball coaches
Vermont Catamounts women's basketball players
Shooting guards